Woytowicz is a Polish surname. It may refer to:

 Bolesław Woytowicz (1899–1980), Polish classical pianist, composer, and teacher  
 Monika Woytowicz (born 1944), German actress 
 Stefania Woytowicz (1922–2005), Polish operatic soprano 
 

Polish-language surnames